Peltigera canina, commonly known as the dog lichen, is a widely distributed species of foliose lichen in the family Peltigeraceae. It was originally described by Carl Linnaeus in his 1753 work Species Plantarum. German botanist Carl Ludwig Willdenow transferred it to the genus Peltigera in 1787. This species is currently undergoing research as it is likely multiple species under one united name.

Description
Peltigera canina has a brown to brownish-grey thallus when dry. The lichen typically grows on soil, in woodlands, fields, and sandy areas The cyanobiont Nostoc associates with Peltigera canina, and resembles the species N. sphaericum and N. punctiforme.

References

canina
Lichen species
Lichens of Europe
Lichens of North America
Lichens described in 1753
Lichens of Canada
Taxa named by Carl Linnaeus
Fungi without expected TNC conservation status